Rameez Junaid and Adil Shamasdin were the defending champions, but chose not to compete this year.
Guillermo Durán and Máximo González won the title, defeating Marin Draganja and Aisam-ul-Haq Qureshi in the final, 6–2, 3–6, [10–6].

Seeds

Draw

Draw

References
Main Draw

2016 Grand Prix Hassan II